The Oklahoma City Thunder played its inaugural season in the 2008–09 NBA season. It was the team's 1st season in Oklahoma City since the Seattle SuperSonics relocation was approved by league owners prior to settling a lawsuit. The team played at the Ford Center.

Oklahoma City hosted the New Orleans Hornets for two seasons, due to Hurricane Katrina's devastation along the Gulf Coast in August 2005.

Until 2021, this represents the Thunder's last losing season.

Key dates
 June 26: The 2008 NBA draft took place in New York City.
 July 1: The free agency period started.
 July 2: The Seattle SuperSonics announced their immediate relocation to Oklahoma City, Oklahoma.
 September 3 The team announces name and colors.
 October 8 The Oklahoma City Thunder took the court for the first time in an 88–82 preseason loss against the Minnesota Timberwolves in Billings, Montana.
 October 29 The Oklahoma City Thunder played their first regular season game ever, hosting the Milwaukee Bucks.
 November 2 The Oklahoma City Thunder get their first win as an NBA franchise.
 November 22 P. J. Carlesimo is fired and replaced on an interim basis by Scott Brooks.
 November 28 The Thunder tie the franchise record for consecutive games lost at 14 with a 103–105 loss to the Timberwolves.
 November 29 Oklahoma City snaps 14-game losing streak.
 January 21 Jeff Green shoots Thunder's first buzzer beater to beat the Golden State Warriors 122–121.
 February 14 Kevin Durant wins All-Star Break H.O.R.S.E competition.
 April 15 The Thunder won over Los Angeles Clippers 126–85 to end 23-59 in their first season.
 April 15 Scott Brooks is named full-time coach of Thunder.

Offseason
 Oklahoma City rookies and other young professionals played in the first game of the Orlando summer league. Oklahoma City lost its summer league opener to the Indiana Pacers rookies by a score of 95-78. Earl Calloway scored 16 points and Andre Emmett had 15 for the Pacers, who scored the game's first eight points and never trailed. Jeff Green took the first shot in Oklahoma City's history and it bounced off the rim 43 seconds after tipoff. The first basket came 2:15 into the first quarter by D.J. White, who was drafted by Detroit, traded to Seattle and played in Oklahoma City.
 The Oklahoma City franchise released its season-ticket prices on Thursday, August 14. The franchise announced that there will be 3,400 seats available at $10 per game.
 On average, ticket prices were about 36 per cent higher than they were for the 2007–08 Seattle SuperSonics season. The announcement also stated that the average ticket price would be US$47.51 while Seattle's average ticket price last season was $35. While last year's NBA average ticket price at $48.83, Oklahoma City's rates below the league average.
 Season tickets went on sale on Monday, September 8. Chairman Clay Bennett announced that the last of the 13,000 season tickets available were sold on Friday, September 12, and the team started a waiting list for season tickets.

Pre-season
 The Oklahoma City Thunder made their debut in an 88-82 preseason loss to the Minnesota Timberwolves on October 8, 2008.

First pre-season game

 Kevin Durant took and made the first shot in Oklahoma City history.
 The Thunder had their home debut on October 14, 2008 against the Los Angeles Clippers.

Draft picks

The 2008 NBA Draft was the final time that the Seattle SuperSonics made an NBA Draft appearance, as well as the final time that the SuperSonics appeared in official media publications. In early July, the franchise relocated to Oklahoma City, Oklahoma, and was renamed the Oklahoma City Thunder. The Thunder made their first NBA Draft appearance in 2009.

Roster

Regular season

Standings

Game log

|- bgcolor="#ffcccc"
| 1
| October 29
| Milwaukee
| 
| Russell Westbrook, Chris Wilcox (13)
| Nick Collison, Chris Wilcox (6)
| Russell Westbrook, Earl Watson (4)
| Ford Center19,136
| 0–1

|- bgcolor="#ffcccc"
| 2
| November 1
| @ Houston
| 
| Kevin Durant (26)
| Johan Petro (9)
| Earl Watson (8)
| Toyota Center16,996
| 0–2
|- bgcolor="#bbffbb"
| 3
| November 2
| Minnesota
| 
| Kevin Durant (18)
| Nick Collison (10)
| Earl Watson (4)
| Ford Center18,163
| 1–2
|- bgcolor="#ffcccc"
| 4
| November 5
| Boston
| 
| Kevin Durant (17)
| Chris Wilcox (8)
| Earl Watson (5)
| Ford Center19,136
| 1–3
|- bgcolor="#ffcccc"
| 5
| November 7
| @ Utah
| 
| Kevin Durant (24)
| Nick Collison, Joe Smith, Chris Wilcox (6)
| Kevin Durant, Earl Watson (3)
| EnergySolutions Arena19,911
| 1–4
|- bgcolor="#ffcccc"
| 6
| November 9
| Atlanta
| 
| Kevin Durant (20)
| Joe Smith (9)
| Earl Watson (6)
| Ford Center18,231
| 1–5
|- bgcolor="#ffcccc"
| 7
| November 10
| @ Indiana
| 
| Kevin Durant (37)
| Kevin Durant, Nick Collison, Johan Petro (8)
| Earl Watson (9)
| Conseco Fieldhouse10,165
| 1–6
|- bgcolor="#ffcccc"
| 8
| November 12
| Orlando
| 
| Jeff Green (25)
| Jeff Green (10)
| Earl Watson (8)
| Ford Center18,185
| 1–7
|- bgcolor="#ffcccc"
| 9
| November 14
| @ New York
| 
| Kevin Durant (23)
| Robert Swift (13)
| Earl Watson (8)
| Madison Square Garden18,008
| 1–8
|- bgcolor="#ffcccc"
| 10
| November 15
| @ Philadelphia
| 
| Jeff Green (21)
| Johan Petro (12)
| Jeff Green, Russell Westbrook (4)
| Wachovia Center13,385
| 1–9
|- bgcolor="#ffcccc"
| 11
| November 17
| Houston
| 
| Kevin Durant (29)
| Robert Swift, Johan Petro (8)
| Kevin Durant, Earl Watson (4)
| Ford Center18,145
| 1–10
|- bgcolor="#ffcccc"
| 12
| November 19
| L.A. Clippers
| 
| Kevin Durant (18)
| Joe Smith (7)
| Earl Watson (5)
| Ford Center18,312
| 1–11
|- bgcolor="#ffcccc"
| 13
| November 21
| New Orleans
| 
| Kevin Durant (17)
| Nick Collison (13)
| Earl Watson (4)
| Ford Center19,136
| 1–12
|- bgcolor="#ffcccc"
| 14
| November 22
| @ New Orleans
| 
| Kevin Durant (30)
| Chris Wilcox (10)
| Russell Westbrook (11)
| New Orleans Arena16,023
| 1–13
|- bgcolor="#ffcccc"
| 15
| November 25
| Phoenix
| 
| Kevin Durant (29)
| Chris Wilcox, Jeff Green, Earl Watson, Joe Smith (6)
| Earl Watson (13)
| Ford Center19,136
| 1–14
|- bgcolor="#ffcccc"
| 16
| November 26
| @ Cleveland
| 
| Chris Wilcox (14)
| Chris Wilcox, Nick Collison (5)
| Russell Westbrook, Kyle Weaver (5)
| Quicken Loans Arena19,753
| 1–15
|- bgcolor="#ffcccc"
| 17
| November 28
| Minnesota
| 
| Kevin Durant, Jeff Green (22)
| Chris Wilcox (7)
| Russell Westbrook (8)
| Ford Center18,229
| 1–16
|- bgcolor="#bbffbb"
| 18
| November 29
| @ Memphis
| 
| Kevin Durant (30)
| Kevin Durant (7)
| Earl Watson (7)
| FedExForum11,977
| 2–16

|- bgcolor="#ffcccc"
| 19
| December 3
| @ Charlotte
| 
| Kevin Durant (24)
| Jeff Green (6)
| Earl Watson (11)
| Time Warner Cable Arena11,629
| 2–17
|- bgcolor="#ffcccc"
| 20
| December 5
| @ Orlando
| 
| Russell Westbrook (19)
| Kevin Durant (10)
| Russell Westbrook (5)
| Amway Arena16,812
| 2–18
|- bgcolor="#ffcccc"
| 21
| December 6
| @ Miami
| 
| Russell Westbrook (30)
| Jeff Green (9)
| Earl Watson (12)
| American Airlines Arena17,585
| 2–19
|- bgcolor="#ffcccc"
| 22
| December 8
| Golden State
| 
| Kevin Durant (41)
| Kevin Durant, Nick Collison (10)
| Russell Westbrook, Earl Watson (7)
| Ford Center17,854
| 2–20
|- bgcolor="#ffcccc"
| 23
| December 10
| Memphis
| 
| Kevin Durant (28)
| Nick Collison (8)
| Earl Watson (7)
| Ford Center18,009
| 2–21
|- bgcolor="#ffcccc"
| 24
| December 13
| @ Dallas
| 
| Jeff Green (25)
| Kevin Durant, Russell Westbrook, Nick Collison (8)
| Russell Westbrook, Earl Watson (6)
| American Airlines Center20,190
| 2–22
|- bgcolor="#ffcccc"
| 25
| December 14
| @ San Antonio
| 
| Jeff Green (33)
| Kevin Durant (13)
| Nick Collison (5)
| AT&T Center17,419
| 2–23
|- bgcolor="#ffcccc"
| 26
| December 16
| L.A. Clippers
| 
| Kevin Durant (25)
| Russell Westbrook, Desmond Mason (7)
| Earl Watson (12)
| Ford Center18,275
| 2–24
|- bgcolor="#bbffbb"
| 27
| December 19
| Toronto
| 
| Kevin Durant (26)
| Desmond Mason (10)
| Russell Westbrook (8)
| Ford Center18,806
| 3–24
|- bgcolor="#ffcccc"
| 28
| December 21
| Cleveland
| 
| Kevin Durant (26)
| Jeff Green (10)
| Russell Westbrook (11)
| Ford Center19,136
| 3–25
|- bgcolor="#ffcccc"
| 29
| December 23
| @ Atlanta
| 
| Kevin Durant (28)
| Jeff Green (14)
| Earl Watson (7)
| Philips Arena12,138
| 3–26
|- bgcolor="#ffcccc"
| 30
| December 26
| @ Detroit
| 
| Kevin Durant (26)
| Joe Smith (10)
| Earl Watson (6)
| The Palace of Auburn Hills22,076
| 3–27
|- bgcolor="#ffcccc"
| 31
| December 27
| @ Washington
| 
| Kevin Durant (25)
| Kevin Durant (11)
| Earl Watson (6)
| Verizon Center16,181
| 3–28
|- bgcolor="#ffcccc"
| 32
| December 29
| Phoenix
| 
| Russell Westbrook (31)
| Jeff Green (11)
| Russell Westbrook (5)
| Ford Center19,136
| 3–29
|- bgcolor="#bbffbb"
| 33
| December 31
| Golden State
| 
| Jeff Green (26)
| Kevin Durant (10)
| Kevin Durant, Earl Watson (6)
| Ford Center18,229
| 4–29

|- bgcolor="#ffcccc"
| 34
| January 2
| Denver
| 
| Kevin Durant (33)
| Kevin Durant (9)
| Earl Watson (7)
| Ford Center18,613
| 4–30
|- bgcolor="#bbffbb"
| 35
| January 6
| New York
| 
| Kevin Durant, Jeff Green (27)
| Kevin Durant (12)
| Russell Westbrook (9)
| Ford Center18,487
| 5–30
|- bgcolor="#ffcccc"
| 36
| January 7
| @ Minnesota
| 
| Nick Collison (17)
| Nick Collison (10)
| Russell Westbrook (12)
| Target Center10,272
| 5–31
|- bgcolor="#ffcccc"
| 37
| January 9
| Houston
| 
| Kevin Durant (27)
| Nick Collison (10)
| Russell Westbrook (6)
| Ford Center19,136
| 5–32
|- bgcolor="#bbffbb"
| 38
| January 10
| @ Chicago
| 
| Kevin Durant (28)
| Kevin Durant, Jeff Green, Russell Westbrook (12)
| Earl Watson (11)
| United Center20,469
| 6–32
|- bgcolor="#ffcccc"
| 39
| January 12
| @ New Jersey
| 
| Kevin Durant (26)
| Jeff Green (10)
| Earl Watson (9)
| Izod Center12,972
| 6–33
|- bgcolor="#bbffbb"
| 40
| January 14
| Utah
| 
| Jeff Green (23)
| Nenad Krstić, Nick Collison (11)
| Russell Westbrook (7)
| Ford Center18,437
| 7–33
|- bgcolor="#bbffbb"
| 41
| January 16
| Detroit
| 
| Kevin Durant (32)
| Jeff Green (14)
| Russell Westbrook (6)
| Ford Center19,136
| 8–33
|- bgcolor="#ffcccc"
| 42
| January 18
| Miami
| 
| Kevin Durant (31)
| Russell Westbrook (8)
| Earl Watson (6)
| Ford Center19,136
| 8–34
|- bgcolor="#bbffbb"
| 43
| January 21
| @ Golden State
| 
| Russell Westbrook (30)
| Kevin Durant (12)
| Russell Westbrook (7)
| Oracle Arena19,318
| 9–34
|- bgcolor="#ffcccc"
| 44
| January 23
| @ L.A. Clippers
| 
| Kevin Durant (46)
| Kevin Durant (15)
| Kyle Weaver (5)
| Staples Center14,913
| 9–35
|- bgcolor="#bbffbb"
| 45
| January 26
| New Jersey
| 
| Kevin Durant (18)
| Chris Wilcox (9)
| Kevin Durant, Russell Westbrook (4)
| Ford Center18,264
| 10–35
|- bgcolor="#bbffbb"
| 46
| January 28
| Memphis
| 
| Kevin Durant (35)
| Kevin Durant (10)
| Kevin Durant (6)
| Ford Center18,450
| 11–35
|- bgcolor="#ffcccc"
| 47
| January 30
| @ Utah
| 
| Kevin Durant (29)
| Kevin Durant (10)
| Kevin Durant, Earl Watson (4)
| EnergySolutions Arena19,911
| 11–36

|- bgcolor="#ffcccc"
| 48
| February 1
| @ Sacramento
| 
| Russell Westbrook (34)
| Nick Collison (14)
| Russell Westbrook (8)
| ARCO Arena10,817
| 11–37
|- bgcolor="#ffcccc"
| 49
| February 4
| Denver
| 
| Kevin Durant (31)
| Kevin Durant, Nick Collison (8)
| Earl Watson (8)
| Ford Center18,332
| 11–38
|- bgcolor="#bbffbb"
| 50
| February 6
| Portland
| 
| Kevin Durant (31)
| Nick Collison (13)
| Earl Watson (11)
| Ford Center18,694
| 12–38
|- bgcolor="#bbffbb"
| 51
| February 8
| Sacramento
| 
| Kevin Durant (39)
| Kevin Durant, Jeff Green, Russell Westbrook (7)
| Russell Westbrook (8)
| Ford Center18,271
| 13–38
|- bgcolor="#ffcccc"
| 52
| February 10
| @ L.A. Lakers
| 
| Kevin Durant (31)
| Kevin Durant (10)
| Russell Westbrook (7)
| Staples Center18,997
| 13–39
|- bgcolor="#ffcccc"
| 53
| February 11
| @ Portland
| 
| Russell Westbrook (21)
| Russell Westbrook (12)
| Earl Watson (5)
| Rose Garden20,050
| 13–40
|- bgcolor="#ffcccc"
| 54
| February 17
| New Orleans
| 
| Kevin Durant (47)
| Nenad Krstić (10)
| Earl Watson (7)
| Ford Center18,593
| 13–41
|- bgcolor="#ffcccc"
| 55
| February 20
| @ Phoenix
| 
| Kevin Durant (35)
| Jeff Green (14)
| Russell Westbrook (8)
| US Airways Center18,422
| 13–42
|- bgcolor="#ffcccc"
| 56
| February 21
| @ Golden State
| 
| Kevin Durant (32)
| Jeff Green (15)
| Russell Westbrook (11)
| Oracle Arena19,108
| 13–43
|- bgcolor="#ffcccc"
| 57
| February 24
| L.A. Lakers
| 
| Kevin Durant (32)
| Nenad Krstić (11)
| Kevin Durant (6)
| Ford Center19,136
| 13–44
|- bgcolor="#ffcccc"
| 58
| February 27
| @ Dallas
| 
| Russell Westbrook (33)
| Jeff Green (12)
| Earl Watson (11)
| American Airlines Center20,007
| 13–45
|- bgcolor="#bbffbb"
| 59
| February 28
| @ Memphis
| 
| Jeff Green (27)
| Thabo Sefolosha (11)
| Russell Westbrook (7)
| FedExForum10,074
| 14–45

|- bgcolor="#bbffbb"
| 60
| March 2
| Dallas
| 
| Nenad Krstić (26)
| Russell Westbrook (10)
| Russell Westbrook (10)
| Ford Center18,527
| 15–45
|- bgcolor="#bbffbb"
| 61
| March 4
| Washington
| 
| Nenad Krstić (18)
| Nick Collison (10)
| Russell Westbrook (8)
| Ford Center18,576
| 16–45
|- bgcolor="#ffcccc"
| 62
| March 7
| @ New Orleans
| 
| Russell Westbrook (24)
| Nick Collison (8)
| Malik Rose (5)
| New Orleans Arena18,114
| 16–46
|- bgcolor="#bbffbb"
| 63
| March 8
| Philadelphia
| 
| Nenad Krstić (20)
| Nick Collison (11)
| Russell Westbrook (5)
| Ford Center18,738
| 17–46
|- bgcolor="#bbffbb"
| 64
| March 10
| @ Sacramento
| 
| Jeff Green, Russell Westbrook (22)
| Nenad Krstić (15)
| Russell Westbrook (4)
| ARCO Arena10,784
| 18–46
|- bgcolor="#ffcccc"
| 65
| March 11
| @ Denver
| 
| Jeff Green (19)
| Thabo Sefolosha (9)
| Earl Watson (7)
| Pepsi Center16,186
| 18–47
|- bgcolor="#ffcccc"
| 66
| March 14
| @ Phoenix
| 
| Kevin Durant (22)
| Jeff Green (10)
| Russell Westbrook (7)
| US Airways Center18,422
| 18–48
|- bgcolor="#bbffbb"
| 67
| March 16
| San Antonio
| 
| Kevin Durant (25)
| Nick Collison (10)
| Chucky Atkins (3)
| Ford Center19,136
| 19–48
|- bgcolor="#ffcccc"
| 68
| March 18
| Chicago
| 
| Kevin Durant (28)
| Nick Collison (13)
| Russell Westbrook (6)
| Ford Center19,136
| 19–49
|- bgcolor="#ffcccc"
| 69
| March 20
| Utah
| 
| Kevin Durant (24)
| Kevin Durant (12)
| Kevin Durant (5)
| Ford Center19,136
| 19–50
|- bgcolor="#bbffbb"
| 70
| March 22
| @ Minnesota
| 
| Kevin Durant (30)
| Kevin Durant, Russell Westbrook (8)
| Russell Westbrook (10)
| Target Center18,561
| 20–50
|- bgcolor="#ffcccc"
| 71
| March 24
| L.A. Lakers
| 
| Kevin Durant (24)
| Nick Collison (8)
| Russell Westbrook (6)
| Ford Center19,136
| 20–51
|- bgcolor="#ffcccc"
| 72
| March 27
| @ Toronto
| 
| Nick Collison (21)
| Nick Collison, Thabo Sefolosha (7)
| Russell Westbrook (5)
| Air Canada Centre17,127
| 20–52
|- bgcolor="#ffcccc"
| 73
| March 29
| @ Boston
| 
| Russell Westbrook (23)
| Jeff Green (9)
| Kyle Weaver (7)
| TD Banknorth Garden18,624
| 20–53
|- bgcolor="#bbffbb"
| 74
| March 31
| @ San Antonio
| 
| Kevin Durant (31)
| Kevin Durant, Nenad Krstić (8)
| Russell Westbrook (10)
| AT&T Center18,797
| 21–53

|- bgcolor="#ffcccc"
| 75
| April 3
| Portland
| 
| Kevin Durant (13)
| Russell Westbrook (8)
| Chucky Atkins, Russell Westbrook (4)
| Ford Center19,136
| 21–54
|- bgcolor="#ffcccc"
| 76
| April 5
| Indiana
| 
| Kevin Durant (25)
| Shaun Livingston, Russell Westbrook (7)
| Shaun Livingston (5)
| Ford Center19,136
| 21–55
|- bgcolor="#ffcccc"
| 77
| April 7
| San Antonio
| 
| Kevin Durant (24)
| Thabo Sefolosha (9)
| Kevin Durant, Russell Westbrook (6)
| Ford Center19,136
| 21–56
|- bgcolor="#ffcccc"
| 78
| April 8
| @ Denver
| 
| Kevin Durant (31)
| Kevin Durant (7)
| Russell Westbrook (11)
| Pepsi Center16,536
| 21–57
|- bgcolor="#bbffbb"
| 79
| April 10
| Charlotte
| 
| Kevin Durant (20)
| Jeff Green (11)
| Russell Westbrook (11)
| Ford Center19,136
| 22–57
|- bgcolor="#ffcccc"
| 80
| April 11
| @ Milwaukee
| 
| Kevin Durant (19)
| Kyle Weaver (9)
| Earl Watson (7)
| Bradley Center15,418
| 22–58
|- bgcolor="#ffcccc"
| 81
| April 13
| @ Portland
| 
| Earl Watson (16)
| Nenad Krstić (7)
| Russell Westbrook (7)
| Rose Garden20,655
| 22–59
|- bgcolor="#bbffbb"
| 82
| April 15
| @ L.A. Clippers
| 
| Kevin Durant (26)
| D. J. White (11)
| Earl Watson (14)
| Staples Center19,060
| 23–59

Player statistics

Season

* Statistics with Oklahoma City.

Awards and records

Awards

Week/Month
 Russell Westbrook was named Western Conference rookie of the month in December and February.

All-Star
 Russell Westbrook, Jeff Green and Kevin Durant played in the Rookie Challenge, where Durant was named MVP.
 Kevin Durant won the H–O–R–S–E Competition.

Season
 Russell Westbrook was selected to the All-Rookie 1st team.

Records

Transactions

Overview

Trades

Free agency

Re-signed

Additions

Subtractions

See also
 Seattle SuperSonics relocation to Oklahoma City
 2008–09 NBA season

References

Oklahoma City Thunder seasons
Oklahoma City
2008 in sports in Oklahoma
2009 in sports in Oklahoma